Fabiano Monteiro de Oliveira or also known as Fabiano Oliveira (born March 6, 1987 in Seropédica), is a Brazilian striker who most recently played for Birkirkara.

Career

Flamengo Youth Team
Started since the time he played for the Juniores, Fabiano Oliveira won in Estádio da Gávea beyond the status of promise, he was titled "Carioca of the Year 2005". For good of the Indeed football team he played as part of the good performances player of the team, already fielded since 2004, however, as he was old enough to take part in the Juniores team he has strengthened the team led by Adílio and earned the Campeonato Carioca de Juniores of 2005.

Flamengo
By end of state competition, Oliveira was integrated to professional staff, and appeared in 26 matches in 2005, making four goals. The first, in a match against Tupi under the command of technical Celso Roth.

Brazil U-18 and Renewal
Later that year, Oliveira was to be convened by coach Renê Weber for the Brazil U-18, who contest the XXIII International Tournament of the Milk Cup and finally signed a contract with Flamengo until 2011, with an estimated salary of R$6 million.

Champion of Copa do Brasil and loan to Goiás
Despite being of use sporadically in Flamengo, Fabiano remained in the team and resisted commands of Waldemar Lemos, Valdir Espinosa and Ney Franco. He formed the scratch champion of Copa do Brasil in 2006 and played 22 games that season, scoring of 4 new goals. However, in 2007, with the cast swelling, Flamengo, despite followed compliments, coach Ney Franco decided to lend it to Goiás.

Disputed in the 2007 season by Goiás, where he was partly fundamental and he was almost demoted to second division of Campeonato Brasileiro.

Fortaleza and CD Nacional
Already in the year 2008, he returned to Flamengo and has not been regarded by the future-coach Joel Santana. Little reminded, the club had its name speculated on Fortaleza but eventually even being negotiated by a loan to European football, more precisely to the CD Nacional of Portugal.

Giresunspor
In 2009, the signed loan agreement with the Turkish Giresunspor and has already scored in the first season 13 goals in 36 games for the club, twelve in Second Division National Championship and by a Turkish Cup.

Return and loan to Boluspor
Despite the good retrospect in Giresunspor, Fabiano, who in 2010 renewed its contract with the Flamengo for more two years, has not borrowed to that club again, but to his rival Boluspor, also in Turkey.

Honours
 Flamengo
Copa do Brasil: 2006

Contract
Flamengo 1 August 2006 to 30 July 2011

References

External links
 sambafoot
 zerozero.pt
 soccerterminal
 Guardian Stats Centre
 globoesporte
 goiasesporteclube.com

1987 births
Living people
Brazilian footballers
Brazil youth international footballers
Brazilian expatriate footballers
Expatriate footballers in Portugal
Expatriate footballers in Turkey
Campeonato Brasileiro Série A players
Primeira Liga players
CR Flamengo footballers
Goiás Esporte Clube players
Fortaleza Esporte Clube players
C.D. Nacional players
Giresunspor footballers
Boluspor footballers
Boavista Sport Club players
Adanaspor footballers
Esporte Clube Tigres do Brasil players
C.F. União players
Association football forwards